Route 580 is a  road that stretches from Route 56 in Wailua to where the road is no longer serviced by Hawaii Department of Transportation just south of the Wailua Reservoir on the island of Kauai.

Route description
The starts at the intersection of Route 56 near the Kauai shorelines where the Pacific Ocean's tide comes on to the shore.  Route 580 intersection with Route 56 is also at the corner of the famous Coco Palms Resort.  Route 580 primarily follows the Wailua River as the road increases in elevation. It passes the outlook to 'Opaeka'a Falls. Route 580 mainly goes through residential areas and patchy forests as the road continues onshore.  Route 580 abruptly comes to an end as the road crosses a creek near the reservoir.  The continues on as a one lane dirt road, but is only recommended for vehicles who have four-wheel drive.

Major intersections

External links

Route Log

Transportation in Kauai County, Hawaii
 0580